The Rolling Stones' 1965 3rd European Tour was a concert tour by the band. The tour commenced on June 15 and concluded on June 29, 1965.

The Rolling Stones
Mick Jagger - lead vocals, harmonica, percussion
Keith Richards - guitar, backing vocals
Brian Jones - guitar, harmonica, backing vocals
Bill Wyman - bass guitar, backing vocals
Charlie Watts - drums

Tour set list
Songs performed include:
Not Fade Away
Route 66
Off The Hook
Little Red Rooster
Come On
Play With Fire
Pain In My Heart
It's All Over Now
The Last Time
I'm Moving On
I'm Alright
Around and Around
Time Is On My Side
Everybody Needs Somebody To Love

Tour dates

References
Carr, Roy.  The Rolling Stones: An Illustrated Record.  Harmony Books, 1976.  

The Rolling Stones concert tours
1965 concert tours
1965 in Europe
Concert tours of Europe